Jardinópolis may refer to:

 Jardinópolis, Santa Catarina
 Jardinópolis, São Paulo